The Mascoma River is a  river in western New Hampshire in the United States. It is a tributary of the Connecticut River, which flows to Long Island Sound. The Mascoma comprises two sections which are split by Mascoma Lake in the communities of Enfield and Lebanon.  Counting the lake would add  to the river's length.

The Mascoma River begins at Cummins Pond in a heavily forested part of the town of Dorchester and flows south into the town of Canaan, collecting water flowing from Reservoir Pond, Clark Pond, and Canaan Street Lake before reaching the Indian River. Here it turns west, collecting tributaries arriving from Goose Pond and Crystal Lake, before it passes through the mill town of Enfield and arrives at Mascoma Lake.

At the western end of Mascoma Lake, the Mascoma River, now in Lebanon, drops quickly over rapids, passing numerous small hydroelectric dams in the center of Lebanon and on its way to West Lebanon, where it reaches the Connecticut River. The section of the river immediately downstream of the Mascoma Lake dam is reserved for fly fishing only, while other portions of the river are open for all types of fishermen. The river is stocked by the New Hampshire Fish and Game Department.

For most of its path from the Indian River to the Connecticut, the Mascoma River and its valley have influenced the location of numerous transportation routes, including U.S. Route 4 and an inactive, state-owned rail line known as the Northern Railroad, most of which has now been converted to a rail trail.

See also

List of rivers of New Hampshire

References

Rivers of New Hampshire
Tributaries of the Connecticut River
Rivers of Grafton County, New Hampshire
New Hampshire placenames of Native American origin